Anarsia sthenarota is a moth in the family Gelechiidae. It was described by Edward Meyrick in 1926. It is found on Borneo.

References

sthenarota
Moths described in 1926
Moths of Borneo